PhysChemComm was a peer-reviewed scientific journal that was published by the Royal Society of Chemistry between 1998 and 2003. It covered all aspects of physical chemistry and chemical physics, and their interfaces with condensed matter, physics and biological, materials and surface science. The journal was abstracted and indexed in Chemical Abstracts Service and Scopus. According to the Journal Citation Reports, the journal's last impact factor of 1.500 was issued in 2005.

See also
 Physical Chemistry Chemical Physics

References

External links

Chemistry journals
Physics education in the United Kingdom
Royal Society of Chemistry academic journals
Publications established in 1998
English-language journals
Publications disestablished in 2003
Defunct journals of the United Kingdom